The Sammarinese ambassadrice next Beijing is the official representative of the Government in the City of San Marino to the government of the People's Republic of China.

List of representatives

See also 
 China–San Marino relations

References 

 
China
San Marino